The I-League (known as Hero I-League for sponsorship ties with Hero MotoCorp) is the second-tier men's professional football competition of the Indian football league system. It is currently contested by 12 clubs across the country with the winners getting promotion to play in the premier division, the Indian Super League.

The competition was founded in 2007 as the successor to the National Football League, with the first season starting in November 2007. The league was launched as India's first ever top-tier professional football league with the aim to increase the player pool for the India national team. I-League operates on a system of promotion and relegation with the I-League 2 and at first only promotion system with the Indian Super League, from the 2022–23 season.

Since the inception of the I-League, a total of seven clubs have been crowned champions. Dempo have won the most titles in league history, being crowned champions three times. Churchill Brothers, Mohun Bagan, Bengaluru, Gokulam Kerala and Minerva Punjab have won the league twice. Salgaocar, Aizawl,  and Chennai City have won it once.

History

Origins
In 1996, the first domestic league was started in India, known as the National Football League, in an effort to introduce professionalism in Indian football. Despite that ambition, that has not been achieved to this date. During the National Football League days, the league suffered from poor infrastructure and unprofessionalism from its clubs. One of the clubs in the league, FC Kochin, went defunct in 2002 after it was revealed that the club had not paid salaries since 2000, after making up 2.5 crores of losses in a season.

After a decade of decline with the National Football League, the All India Football Federation decided it was time for a change. This resulted in the modern day iteration of the top-tier in India.

Formation
After the 2006–07 NFL season, it was announced that it would be rebranded as the I-League for the 2007–08 season. The league's first season consisted of eight teams from the previous NFL campaign and two teams from the 2nd Division to form a 10 team league. Oil and Natural Gas Corporation (ONGC), the title sponsors of the previous NFL, were named as the title sponsors of the I-League before the league kicked off in November 2007. The league also announced a change in their foreign-player restrictions with the new rule being that all the clubs could sign four foreigners – three non-Asian and one which must be Asian. The league also announced that, for the first season, matches will be broadcast on Zee Sports.

The original ten clubs in the I-League's first season were Air India, Churchill Brothers, Dempo, East Bengal, JCT, Mahindra United, Mohun Bagan, Salgaocar, Sporting Goa and Viva Kerala.

The early seasons (2007–2012)
The first ever I-League match took place on 24 November 2007 between Dempo and Salgaocar. The match, which took place at the Fatorda Stadium in Margao, ended 3–0 in favour of Dempo with Chidi Edeh scoring the first ever goal in league history in the third minute. After eighteen rounds it was Dempo who came out as the first ever champions in the I-League. Viva Kerala and Salgaocar, however, ended up as the first two teams to ever be relegated from the I-League.

The next season the I-League was expanded from 10 to 12 teams. Mumbai, Chirag United, Mohammedan, and Vasco were all promoted from the I-League 2nd Division to make the expansion possible. This however brought up early concerns over how "national" the I-League was. The 2008–09 season would see eleven of the twelve teams come from three different cities. The previous season saw all ten teams come from four different cities. Bhaichung Bhutia, then captain of the India national team, said that it was the federations job to spread the game across the country and that it needed to happen.

Regardless of the early criticism, the I-League went on as scheduled and once the 2008–09 season concluded. it was Churchill Brothers who came out on top. Then, before the 2009–10 season, the league was once again expanded from 12 teams to 14. In order to make this happen Salgaocar, Viva Kerala, Pune, and Shillong Lajong were all promoted from the 2nd Division to the I-League. This helped the I-League retain some criticism about how national the league was as now the league would be played in seven different cities/states: Goa, Kerala, Kolkata, Mumbai, Pune, Punjab, and Shillong.

After the 2009–10 season it was Dempo who came out on top for the second time in I-League history.

Conflict of parties
On 9 December 2010 the All India Football Federation signed a 15-year, 700-crore deal with Reliance Industries and International Management Group of the United States. The deal gave IMG-Reliance exclusive commercial rights to sponsorship, advertising, broadcasting, merchandising, video, franchising, and rights to create a new football league. This deal came about after the AIFF ended their 10-year deal with Zee Sports five years early.

Two months later, on 8 February 2011, it was reported that twelve of the fourteen I-League clubs held a private meeting in Mumbai to discuss the ongoing issues related to the league. It was never revealed what was exactly talked about at this meeting. Then, on 22 February, it was announced that the same twelve I-League clubs that attended the meeting would not be signing the AFC–licensing papers needed to play in the I-League. The reasoning for this was because the I-League clubs were not happy over the fact that IMG-Reliance had so far done nothing to promote the I-League and that they demanded the I-League be made a separate entity from both the AIFF and IMG-Reliance. At this time however there were rumours that IMG-Reliance had been planning on revamping the I-League along the same lines as Major League Soccer of the United States for the 2012–13 season.

On 11 March 2012, following the disbanding of two former I-League clubs – JCT and Mahindra United, it was announced that the I-League clubs would be forming their own organization known as the Indian Professional Football Clubs Association (IPFCA) in order to safeguard their interest and promote football in India. Every club, except for HAL and AIFF–owned Pailan Arrows, joined the newly formed organization. Soon after, it was announced that there would be a meeting held between the AIFF, IMG-Reliance, and the IPFCA on 20 April 2012. In this meeting, IMG-Reliance would present their plan on how they would grow the I-League but the meeting never occurred for reasons unknown.

Then, on 4 May 2012, the AIFF hosted the last ad hoc meeting – an annual meeting between the AFC and AIFF to assess the growth of Indian football. The AFC president at the time, Zhang Jilong, was also in attendance at this meeting. It was reported that the IPFCA would use this meeting to voice their displeasure at the AIFF and IMG-Reliance but the association never showed up at the meeting.

On 18 June 2012 the IPFCA was officially sanctioned under the Society's Act of 1960.

League improvement

Despite the ongoing war between the AIFF, IMG-Reliance, and the IPFCA, the league did manage to improve its product on the field and awareness did increase during this period. It all started when the India national team participated in the AFC Asian Cup in 2011 for the first time in 27 years. Despite being knocked-out in the group stage after losing all three of their games, India came back home more popular than ever. Subrata Pal, of Pune gained the most popularity after his impressive performances in goal for India during the Asian Cup. At the same time, before the Asian Cup, Sunil Chhetri became the second Indian footballer in the modern footballing era to move abroad when he signed for the Kansas City Wizards in Major League Soccer in 2010. He also became the first exported Indian from the I-League.

The league was then given a major boost from its main derby, the Kolkata derby, between East Bengal and Mohun Bagan. On 20 November 2011, 90,000 people watched at the Salt Lake Stadium as Mohun Bagan defeated East Bengal 1–0. The league also saw more expansion to others areas with the promotion of United Sikkim from the 2nd Division, however, their reign was short lived as financial troubles saw them relegated the next season.

Meanwhile, while the league continued to grow, so did the players' demand. During this period plenty of Indian players were wanted on trial by foreign clubs, mainly in Europe. After his return from MLS, Sunil Chhetri and international teammate Jeje Lalpekhlua were called for trials at Scottish Premier League side Rangers in 2011. Subrata Pal had trials at RB Leipzig before finally signing for Vestsjælland in 2014. And Gurpreet Singh Sandhu underwent trials at then Premier League side Wigan Athletic and finally signing for Stabæk Fotball, Norway in 2014.

At the same time, as Indian players demand abroad increased, the demand for higher quality foreigners in the I-League also increased. Former A-League player of the year and Costa Rican international Carlos Hernández signed with Prayag United before the 2012–13 season from the Melbourne Victory. Lebanese international Bilal Najjarine also signed with Churchill Brothers in 2012.

Demotion to second tier
On 18 May 2016, IMG–Reliance, along with the AIFF and I-League representatives met during a meeting in Mumbai. At the meeting, it was proposed that starting from the 2017–18 season, the Indian Super League becomes the top-tier football league in India while the I-League gets relegated to the second tier, but  the idea was not entertained by the I-League representatives.

In 2017, FIFA and the AFC had appointed a committee to look at the footballing landscape in the country which was in disarray due to two simultaneous leagues running together, and come up with solutions to re-establish a singular league pyramid which would be acceptable for everyone. In the month of June, IMG–Reliance, the AIFF and the I-League representatives, met with the AFC in Kuala Lumpur in order to find a new way forward for Indian football. The AFC were against allowing the ISL as the premier league in India while the clubs like East Bengal and Mohun Bagan wanted a complete merger of ISL and I-League. A couple weeks later, the AIFF proposed that both ISL and I-League run simultaneously on a short–term basis with the I-League champions retaining the spot for the AFC Champions League qualifying stage, while the AFC Cup qualifying stage spot going to the ISL champions. The proposal from the AIFF was officially approved by the AFC on 25 July 2017, with the ISL replacing the domestic cup competition, the Federation Cup. 

On 14 October 2019, the AFC held a summit in Kuala Lumpur, chaired by the AFC Secretary General Windsor John, which involved key stakeholders from the AIFF, the FSDL, the ISL and the I-League clubs, and other major stakeholders to propose a new roadmap to facilitate the football league system in India. Based on the roadmap that was prepared by the AFC and the AIFF at the summit and was finally approved by the AFC Executive Committee on 26 October in Da Nang, in 2019–20 season, ISL will attain the country's top-tier league status, allowing the ISL premiers to play AFC Champions League and the I-League champions to play AFC Cup. In addition, starting with the 2022–23 season, I-League will lose the top-tier status, wherein the champion of the I-League will stand a chance to be promoted to the ISL with no participation fee. In its recommendation for 2024–25, it was agreed to fully implement promotion and relegation between the two leagues, and abolition of parallel league system.

Criticisms

Financial situation
One of the major criticisms of the I-League has been the league's continuing financial instability. Since the league began in 2007 the league has seen four clubs disband their operations – Chirag United Kerala, JCT, Mahindra United, and Pailan Arrows. When JCT disbanded, head of operations, Samir Thapar stated that the lack of any credible exposure and money as a major reason for JCT disbanding. The majority of clubs in the league rely on main sponsors the fund the team through a season at least. This is mainly due to the fact that clubs in the I-League do not rely on income from merchandise sales or ticket sales and that television revenue goes directly to the All India Football Federation instead of the clubs.

Currently, attendance in the I-League is suffering as the 2013–14 season only averaged 5,618 per game. Mohun Bagan averaged the most spectators that season with an average of 17,068 while Shillong Lajong ended up being the only other I-League club to finish with an average attendance over 10,000 when the finished at 11,308 per game. Part of the reason for these attendances other than the lack of marketing has been cited as being the fact that most I-League matches start in the afternoon, when it is uncomfortably hot for fans, rather than during the cooler evenings.

Institutional football
Many football clubs in India are termed as institutional teams, in other words controlled or owned by an industrial business. That means it is difficult for players or coaches to turn into complete professionals. The players who play for institutional teams would also work on a full-time job outside the game for the company the team was owned by. This is much the same model which was found in Japan before the introduction of the J. League. The positives are that the teams are usually well resourced with players earning decent money and the reassuring prospect of employment after their footballing days finish. On the negative side, teams only effectively represent an individual business with a few thousand workers, rather than whole cities, and thus do not gain broad general support.

On 21 February 2014 it was officially announced that the two remaining institutional clubs in the I-League – Air India and ONGC – had been expelled from the I-League and that all other institutional clubs would not be allowed to participate in the league.

Competition format
Since the league began in 2007, the rules have changed almost yearly. Currently, the league has 12 teams. Each club plays each other twice during the season, once at home and the other time away. At the end of the season, the team with the most points wins the league and gains promotion to the top flight Indian Super League. In the case of a tie then head-to-head record is looked upon. Further, in the case of a tie the goal difference is looked upon the tied teams.

Proposed League system Vision 2047

2023 - 2026

AIFF has broken down ‘Vision 2047’ into six four-year strategic plans. The first of these will look to cover the period till 2026. According this plan in 2026 Indian football season 40 clubs will participate in ISL(14 clubs), I-League (14 clubs) and I-League-2 (12clubs). Moreover 60 clubs will participate in 5 zonal leagues with minimum 12 teams in each zone. 

How ever AIFF's new strategic plan 2026, the number of teams in the current leagues needs to be increased. By the 2026 season, ILeague-2 will have to be rebranded to a full league format with at least 12 teams with relegation and promotion. In 2026 season onwards State FA league champions won't promote directly to I-League2. SFA champions will promote their respective Zonal league and Then each Zonal league champions will play I-League-2 qualifier.

Regional League and Zonal League

According to Vision 2047, there will be 40 clubs in various national leagues when the first strategic plan is completed by the 2026 season. Also there will be 60 clubs in 5 zonal leagues. Apart from this there will be 300-450 clubs in 30-35 State Football Associations leagues. The state football associations produces 30-35 state champions every season. The proposed system is unable to accommodate these SFA champions. This will pave the way for revamping the zonal league into a new structure.

Regional League

All SFAs under AIFF are divided into 2 regions to form a Regional league below I-League2. The bottom teams in I-League2 will relegate to Regional League and the champions of Regional League will promote to I-League2.

Bottom teams in Regional League will relegate to Zonal league. Zonal League champions will promote to Regional League.

Zonal League
Currently the zones are divided by geographically. North, West,East, South and North-East are the five zones. As per the new system, while zones are divided in proportion to the number of SFAs. According to this, there will be 8/12 zones instead of the current 5 zones. Each season SFA League Champions will be promoted to each Zonal League and teams who finish bottom in Zonal League will be relegated to SFA Leagues.Zonal league champions will be promoted to regional leagues.

2026-2030
According to the Vision 2047 after completing the second strategic plan in 2030 the Indian football structure would be like this.

Clubs
A total of 36 clubs have played in the I-League since its inception in 2007, up to the current season.

Current clubs

All-time points table
The following is a list of clubs who have played in the I-League at any time since its formation in 2007 to the current season. Teams playing in the 2021-22 I-League season are indicated in bold. A total of 36 teams have played in the I-League.

Sponsorship

Since the original National Football League, the Indian league has always been sponsored. When the I-League began in 2007 the last sponsor from the old National Football League, ONGC, were brought in as the sponsors, making the league be known as the ONGC I-League. However, after the 2010–11 season, the deal with ONGC was not renewed and the I-League was left without a sponsorship deal till 2013. On 24 September 2013, it was announced that telecommunications company, Airtel would be the new title sponsor of the I-League, thus making the league known as the Airtel I-League. In December 2014, it was announced that Hero MotoCorp would replace Airtel as the title sponsor for the league and hence the league would be known has Hero I-League.

Media coverage

 2017 – present
2022-23 I-League season is airing on DD Sport and Eurosport HD television channel in India. It is live streaming on Discovery+ mobile app. From this season the league returned to its original Away Home format, clubs scheduled to play home matches at their home grounds.

AIFF has signed a three-year deal with Lex Sportel Vision Pvt. Ltd. to broadcast the I-League on DSport starting 2019–20 season. The 13th edition of I-League is scheduled to commence from 30 November, featuring 11 teams and 110 matches. Separately, AIFF has commissioned Instat Limited – an Ireland-based company to produce feed of the live audio-visual coverage for the broadcast on DSport. Instat will produce all games with an 8-camera setup. AIFF's agreement with Instat Limited will run for three years. I-League for past two seasons was showcased on Star Sports. However, as per the request of the I-League clubs, the AIFF and FSDL (Football Sports Development Limited) negotiated the deal with the new broadcast partner providing exclusive rights for on-air and digital content.

  2007 – 2017
Since 2007 the I-League has managed to find a way to be telecast, which is drastic in increasing the profile and popularity of the league. Before the inaugural 2007–08 season, the All India Football Federation reached a deal with Zee Sports to broadcast 45 of the 90 matches that season with TEN Sports broadcasting 15 matches in the inaugural season. The deal with Zee Sports was a continuation of the 10-year deal reached between the AIFF and Zee Sports in 2005. However, in October 2009, Zee Sports reportedly sent a letter to the AIFF asking for the Federation to review the 10-year contract after concerns were raised by the broadcaster that the league was not attracting as many sponsors as they would have liked. In August 2010 it was revealed that there were crunch talks between the AIFF and Zee Sports over these concerns and that there was a provision in the 10-year deal that said it could be reviewed after the first five years.

Stadiums

Home stadiums of current I-league clubs

Coaches
The role of the head coach in the I-League varies from club to club. Some like to appoint technical or sporting directors as well as manager-style coaches. The All India Football Federation does impose licensing requirements for head coaches in the I-League, the rule being that the head coach must have an AFC Professional Coaching Diploma in order to coach in the I-League. However, some clubs and coaches like Subhash Bhowmick, Subrata Bhattacharya, Sukhwinder Singh and Bimal Ghosh were known for accepting a technical director role in order to bypass the head coaching requirements. This has bought about a lot of controversial news, most recently being when Churchill Brothers won the I-League after the 2012–13 season with Subhash Bhowmick not winning the "Coach of the Year" award, due to being listed as the technical director.

Seeing this, the AIFF technical director, Rob Baan, as well as others, advocated that the federation make it mandatory for both technical directors and head coaches to have an AFC Pro-Diploma. On May 14, 2014 this was officially put into act by the AIFF during their I-League licensing committee meeting.

In terms of coaching performance, after the first seven seasons of the I-League, an Indian head coach has won the I-League four times while a foreign head coach has won it three times. Zoran Đorđević of Serbia was the first ever foreign head coach to win the I-League. Italian coach Vincenzo Alberto Annese became the first coach to win back-to-back I-League titles in 2020–21 and 2021–22 seasons.

Armando Colaco was the first Indian coach to win the I-League in the league's opening season and he has the most I-League championships at three. Khogen Singh is the latest Indian coach to win the I-League in 2017–18 season.

Champions

Successful clubs by seasons 

Notes

Performance by clubs

Stats and players

Individual game highest attendance records

Seasonal statistics

Player transfer fees

Top transfer fees paid by I-League clubs

Top transfer fees received by I-League clubs

Top scorers

Season after season, players in the I-League compete for the golden boot title, which is awarded at the end of each season to the top scorer throughout the entire season. The most recent winner of the golden boot is Bidyashagar Singh, who won the golden boot at the end of the 2020–21 season after scoring 12 goals. Ranti Martins is both currently the holders of the most golden boot titles with five golden boots. Along with Odafa Onyeka Okolie, the two Nigerians make up the eight golden boots won by Nigerians, the most of any nationality in the league.

Awards

The trophy
The I-League has only been awarding a proper trophy to the champion since 2013 when the 2012–13 season champions, Churchill Brothers, won the league. Before 2013 the I-League champions received a basic trophy. The new trophy was designed in Europe and is modeled along the lines of the champion trophies in the top European leagues. Regarding the trophy, the AIFF general secretary, Kushal Das, said "It is the endeavour of AIFF to practice the best principles of other leagues and accordingly we thought to create a more contemporary look to the I-League trophy in line with trophies given in European leagues".

Season awards
End of season I-League awards were previously conducted by the Football Players' Association of India and All India Football Federation since 2008–09 season. Currently the awards include the Hero of the league, the golden boot, the golden glove, the best head coach (Syed Abdul Rahim Award), the best defender (Jarnail Singh Award), the best midfielder and the emerging player of the league, all of which are sponsored by Hero.

Hero of the League

Syed Abdul Rahim Award

Emerging Player of the Season

Foreign Player of the Year

Indian Player of the Season

Fans' Player of the Year

I-League clubs in Asia

Traditionally, I-League clubs have done particularly well in the AFC Cup. In 2008 Dempo managed to reach the semi-finals of the AFC Cup before being defeated by Al-Safa of Lebanon. East Bengal also managed to reach the semi-finals in 2013 before being knocked-out by Kuwait. Bengaluru is the only I-League club to reach the AFC Cup Final in 2016 but lost to Al-Quwa Al-Jawiya of Iraq.

However, in the AFC Champions League, no I-League club has ever managed to make it past the qualifiers.

See also
 Football in India
 History of Indian football
 List of football clubs in India
 2021–23 Indian football club competition play-offs for AFC
 IFA Shield
 NFL Second Division
 NFL Third Division

References

External links 

 "iLeague Fixtures" League Winner (archived). Retrieved on 31 May 2015.

 
2
2007 establishments in India
Sports leagues established in 2007
Sports leagues in India
Professional sports leagues in India
Second level football leagues in Asia